Trękusek  is a village in the administrative district of Gmina Purda, within Olsztyn County, Warmian-Masurian Voivodeship, in northern Poland. It is located within the historic region of Warmia.

The village was founded in 1359.

The historic sights of Trękusek are the Warmian old wayside shrine and the ruins of an early 20th-century manor.

Gallery

References

Villages in Olsztyn County